Daffy Duck is a Warner Bros. cartoon character.

Daffy may also refer to:

Paul Dean (baseball) (1912-1981), American baseball player
Phillip DeFreitas (born 1966), English cricketer
Nick Daffy (born 1973), Australian football player
Boulton Paul Defiant, a British Second World War interceptor aircraft nicknamed "Daffy"
Daffy's Elixir, a patent medicine

Lists of people by nickname